Plantago is a genus of about 200 species of flowering plants in the family Plantaginaceae, commonly called plantains or fleaworts. The common name plantain is shared with the unrelated cooking plantain.

Description
The leaves are sessile or have a poorly defined petiole. They have three or five parallel veins that diverge in the wider part of the leaf. Leaves are broad or narrow, depending on the species.

Species
The boundaries of the genus Plantago have been fairly stable, with the main question being whether to include Bougueria (one species from the Andes) and Littorella (2–3 species of aquatic plants).

There are about 200 species of Plantago, including:

Plantago afra
Plantago africana
Plantago aitchisonii
Plantago alpina
Plantago amplexicaulis
Plantago arborescens
Plantago arenaria—Branched plantain
Plantago argentea
Plantago aristata—Bracted plantain, largebracted plantain
Plantago asiatica—Chinese plantain, obako, arnoglossa
Plantago aucklandica
Plantago bigelovii
Plantago canescens
Plantago coreana
Plantago cordata—Heartleaf plantain
Plantago coronopus—Buckshorn plantain
Plantago cornuti
Plantago cretica
Plantago cynops
Plantago debilis—Shade plantain, weak plantain
Plantago elongata—Prairie plantain, slender plantain
Plantago erecta—California plantain, foothill plantain, dot-seed plantain, English plantain, dwarf plantain
Plantago eriopoda—Redwool plantain
Plantago erosa
Plantago fernandezia
Plantago fischeri
Plantago gentianoides
Plantago glabrifolia
Plantago grayana
Plantago hawaiensis—Hawaiian plantain
Plantago hedleyi
Plantago helleri—Heller's plantain
Plantago heterophylla
Plantago hillebrandii
Plantago himalaica
Plantago holosteum
Plantago hookeriana—Hookers plantain, tallow weed, California plantain
Plantago incisa
Plantago indica
Plantago krajinai
Plantago lagopus—Hare's foot plantain
Plantago lanceolata—Ribwort plantain
Plantago lanigera
Plantago leiopetala—Madeira plantain
Plantago longissima
Plantago macrocarpa
Plantago major—Greater plantain, common plantain
Plantago maritima—Sea plantain
Plantago maxima
Plantago media—Hoary plantain
Plantago melanochrous
Plantago moorei—Moore's plantain
Plantago musicola
Plantago nivalis
Plantago nubicola (also known as Bougueria nubicola)
Plantago obconica
Plantago ovata—Indian wheat, blond psyllium
Plantago pachyphylla
Plantago palmata
Plantago patagonica—Woolly plantain
Plantago polysperma
Plantago princeps
Plantago purshii—Woolly plantain
Plantago pusilla
Plantago psyllium—Sand plantain, French or dark psyllium
Plantago raoulii
Plantago rapensis
Plantago remota
Plantago reniformis
Plantago rhodosperma—Redseed plantain, redseed indianwheat
Plantago rigida
Plantago robusta
Plantago rugelii—Blackseed plantain
Plantago rupicola
Plantago schneideri
Plantago sempervirens
Plantago sparsiflora
Plantago spathulata
Plantago subnuda—Tall coastal plantain
Plantago tanalensis
Plantago taqueti
Plantago tenuiflora
Plantago triandra
Plantago triantha
Plantago tweedyi
Plantago virginica—Virginia plantain, paleseed plantain
Plantago winteri 
Plantago wrightiana—Wright's plantain

Etymology 
The genus name Plantago descends from the classical Latin name , which in classical Latin meant some Plantago species, including Plantago major and Plantago media. In Latin the name was formed from the classical Latin word  = "sole of the foot". The name was so formed in Latin because the leaves of these species grow out near flat at ground level. The suffix  in Latin means "a sort of".

Distribution and habitat 
The species are found all over the world, including the Americas, Asia, Australia, New Zealand, Africa and Europe. Many species in the genus are cosmopolitan weeds. They are found in many different habitats, most commonly in wet areas like seepages or bogs. They can also be found in alpine and semi-alpine or coastal areas. The cosmopolitan weeds can be frequently seen at the side of roads.

Ecology 

Plantains are used as food plants by the larvae of some species of Lepidoptera (butterfly and moth).

Uses
Plantain has been consumed as human food since prehistory. For example, archaeological recovery along California's Central Coast has demonstrated use of this species as a food since the Millingstone Horizon. The broad-leaved varieties are sometimes used as a leaf vegetable for salads, green sauce, and so on. Tender young plantain leaves can be eaten raw and older leaves can be cooked. The seeds can be cooked like rice.

Plantago species have been used since prehistoric times as herbal remedies. The herb is astringent, anti-toxic, antimicrobial, anti-inflammatory, anti-histamine, as well as demulcent, expectorant, styptic and diuretic. Externally, a poultice of the leaves is useful for insect bites, poison-ivy rashes, minor sores, and boils. In folklore it is even claimed to be able to cure snakebite and was used by the Dakota Indian tribe of North America for this. Internally, it is used for coughs and bronchitis, as a tea, tincture, or syrup. Tea made from the leaves may help cure diarrhea.

Plantain seed husks expand and become mucilaginous when wet, especially those of P. psyllium, which is used in common over-the-counter bulk laxative and fiber supplement products such as Metamucil. P. psyllium seed is useful for constipation, irritable bowel syndrome, dietary fiber supplementation, and diverticular disease. Mucilage from desert indianwheat (P. ovata) is obtained by grinding off the husk. This mucilage, also known as psyllium, is commonly sold as Isabgol, a laxative which is used to control irregular bowel syndrome and constipation. It has been used as an indigenous Ayurvedic and Unani medicine for a whole range of bowel problems. Psyllium supplements are typically used in powder form, along with adequate amounts of fluids. A dose of at least 7 grams daily taken with adequate amounts of fluid (water, juice) is used by some for management of elevated cholesterol. There are a number of psyllium products used for constipation. The usual dose is about 3.5 grams twice a day. Psyllium is also a component of several ready-to-eat cereals.

In Serbia, Romania, Bulgaria and Russia, leaves from Plantago major are used as a folk remedy to preventing infection on cuts and scratches because of its antiseptic properties. In Slovenia and other Central European regions, the leaves were traditionally used topically as a cure for blisters resulting from friction (such as caused by tight shoes etc.).

There may also be a use for plantains in the abatement of enteric methane from ruminants, as the natural compounds present (e.g. condensed tannins; ~14 g/kg DM), affect the acetate-propionate ratio in the rumen, which is a primary mechanism by which methanogenesis is restricted. Currently this is not a viable option in any significant scale due to agronomic difficulties.

Culture
As Old English Wegbrade the plantago is one of the nine plants invoked in the pagan Anglo-Saxon Nine Herbs Charm, recorded in the 10th century.

Gallery

References

External links
 
 

 Common Plantain, from Mrs. Grieve's herbal
 Medicinal uses of P. major in Armenia
 Additional information about psyllium, including growing procedure and economic value
 Edibility of Plantago: Visual identification and edible parts of wild plantago.

 
Plantaginaceae genera
Laxatives
Leaf vegetables
Medicinal plants
Taxa named by Carl Linnaeus